Dorcadion almarzense is a species of beetle in the family Cerambycidae. It was described by Escalera in 1902. It is from Spain.

Varietas
 Dorcadion almarzense var. album Nicolas, 1904
 Dorcadion almarzense var. costatum Escalera, 1902
 Dorcadion almarzense var. logronense Pic, 1903
 Dorcadion almarzense var. nigratum Escalera, 1924
 Dorcadion almarzense var. nivosus Escalera, 1924
 Dorcadion almarzense var. obscuratus Escalera, 1924
 Dorcadion almarzense var. rufipedes Escalera, 1924
 Dorcadion almarzense var. schrammi Nicolas, 1904
 Dorcadion almarzense var. subbrevipenne Pic, 1904
 Dorcadion almarzense var. subnivosum Plaviltschikov, 1932
 Dorcadion almarzense var. urbionense Escalera, 1902
 Dorcadion almarzense var. vicentei Nicolas, 1904
 Dorcadion almarzense var. villosladense Escalera, 1902

See also 
Dorcadion

References

almarzense
Beetles described in 1902